S. Gregory Boyd (Greg Boyd) is an American author, attorney, and professor specializing in intellectual property, the game industry, and high technology media. He is currently a partner and the chairman of the Interactive Entertainment Group at Frankfurt Kurnit Klein & Selz PC and an adjunct professor for the New York Law School. He also sits on the Board of Advisors for MobyGames.

Mr. Boyd is co-author (with Sean. F. Kane and Brian Pyne) of Video Game Law: Everything You Need To Know About Legal and Business Issues in the Game Industry (Taylor & Francis/CRC Press, Fall 2018), his second book-length discussion of the industry. He is also co-editor and co-author (with game developer Brian Green) of Business & Legal Primer for Game Development (2007).

Education
Boyd received his B.S. in Biochemistry/Philosophy and M.S. in Molecular Biology/Biotechnology from East Carolina University, and both his M.D. and J.D. from the schools of medicine and law at the University of North Carolina at Chapel Hill. He has also graduated from the NYU Stern MBA program.

Professional life
Boyd is the author of several academic and industry-specific publications on subjects ranging from money laundering in virtual currencies to organ donation. He was also an editor for the International Game Developer's Association's first industry publication on intellectual property.

He has been interviewed on business and legal topics by publications including Fortune, Forbes, and IP Law and Business.  He has spoken at legal and business conferences including the American Intellectual Property Law Association, Licensing Executives Society, Game Developers Conference, Austin Game Conference, and State of Play.  He has also been an invited speaker on business and intellectual property matters at Harvard Business School, MIT, Columbia Law School, and other institutions.

Works
(2007) with Brian Green. Business & Legal Primer for Game Development. Thomson/Charles River Media.

External links
Frankfurt Kurnit Klein & Selz website.
Austin SXSW panel with Boyd on human and property rights in virtual worlds.
Hollywood Reporter panel interview with Boyd about online game business and law.
CNN Money/Fortune article quoting Boyd on litigation issues.
Fortune article quoting Boyd on virtual currency.
Forbes article quoting Boyd on virtual currency exchange.
Boyd article considering a market for organ donation.
Kris Graft article reporting on Boyd IP in games talk at GDC 2007.
News article quoting Boyd on game litigation.
Boyd article on patents in the game industry.
Boyd Gamasutra article on Nintendo patents and other IP protection.
Boyd editorial on copyright protection for games.
Boyd Gamasutra article on Schwarzenegger v. ESA.

Living people
East Carolina University alumni
University of North Carolina School of Law alumni
New York University Stern School of Business alumni
Place of birth missing (living people)
Year of birth missing (living people)
Harvard Business School people
American business writers
American lawyers
American legal writers
University of North Carolina School of Medicine alumni